KSLM may refer to:

 KSLM (AM), a radio station (1220 AM) licensed to serve Salem, Oregon, United States
 KSLM-LD, a low-power digital television station in Salem, Oregon
 KZGD, a radio station (1390 AM) in Salem, Oregon, known as KSLM from 1934 to 2007
 KLM (human-computer interaction), aka "Keystroke-Level Model", a hard science approach to human–computer interaction